George Hillmer (December 5, 1866 – January 20, 1935) was an Ontario merchant and political figure. He represented Halton in the Legislative Assembly of Ontario from 1923 to 1929 as a Conservative member.

He was born in Oakville, Ontario, the son of Edward Hillmer and Jean Titherington. Hillmer originally operated a delivery service and livery stable but later became the proprietor of a Ford agency. In 1894, he married Pauline Bradbury. Hillmer was a member of the town council for Oakville, serving as mayor from 1910 to 1912 and serving eight years as reeve. He defeated Ernest Charles Drury to win a seat in the provincial assembly in 1923. Hillmer was a Master Mason.

References 
 Canadian Parliamentary Guide, 1928, AL Normandin

External links 

1866 births
1935 deaths
Mayors of Oakville, Ontario
Progressive Conservative Party of Ontario MPPs